The list of extinct animals in Martinique and Guadeloupe features the animals of the French Overseas Departments of Martinique and Guadeloupe that have become extinct. Several of the bird species listed are hypothetical. Assuming these birds were true species, 11 animal extinctions have occurred in Martinique, and 11 animal extinction in Guadeloupe. The Lesser Antillean macaw (Ara guadeloupensis) may have been found in both Guadeloupe and Martinique, which makes a total of 21 recent animal extinction in these two French overseas departments.

Mammals 
Martinique giant rice rat, Megalomys desmarestii (1902)
Caribbean monk seal, Neomonachus tropicalis (1952)

Birds 
 Guadeloupe burrowing owl, Athene cunicularia guadeloupensis (1890)
 Guadeloupe parakeet, Psittacara labati (1724, hypothetical)
 Guadeloupe amazon, Amazona violacea (1779)
 Lesser Antillean macaw, Ara guadeloupensis (1760, hypothetical)
 Martinique house wren, Troglodytes aedon martinicensis (1886)
 Martinique amazon, Amazona martinicana (1779, hypothetical)
 Martinique macaw, Ara martinicus (after 1658, hypothetical)
 Jamaican petrel, Pterodroma caribbaea (1879)
 Guadeloupe house wren, Troglodytes aedon guadeloupensis (1973)

Reptiles 
 Martinique giant ameiva, Ameiva major
 Martinique curlytail lizard, Leiocephalus herminieri (1837)
 Guadeloupe ameiva, Pholidoscelis cineraceus (1914)

Arachnids 
 Caribbean monk seal nasal mite, Halarachne americana (1952?)
 Tityus exstinctus, (1890)

Molluscs 
 Amphicyclotulus guadeloupensis
 Incerticyclus cinereus
 Incerticyclus martinicensis 
 Oleacina guadeloupensis 
 Pleurodonte desidens (1834)

See also 
 List of extinct animals of Europe
 List of extinct animals of Réunion

External links 
 The Extinction Website
 IUCN Red List of Threatened Species
 European Union - Nature and Biodiversity

Martinique and Guadeloupe
Extinct animals
Extinct animals
Extinct animals
Extinct animals